Athletics is one of the sports at the quadrennial Mediterranean Games competition. It has been one of the sports competed at the event since the inaugural edition in 1951.

Editions

Events
As of the most recent 2018 edition, the athletics program features 17 men's and 17 women's events. These include a total of 22 track events, 2 road events, and 10 field events.

Men's events

All-time medal table
Updated after the 2022 Mediterranean Games

Games records

External links
Past results 1951–2005 from GBR Athletics

 
Mediterranean Games
A